Tamás Eszes (born June 18, 1976, in Keszthely) is a Laser Standard sailor from Hungary, who competed in two consecutive Summer Olympics for his native country (Atlanta, Sydney). He was trained by Trevor Millar who is the founder of SailCoach. 
Tamás is created Sail Coach Hungary in 2010. After the Sail Coach Hungary he established the European Sailing Academy in 2016.
Currently he is the leader and head coach of his team at the academy, hosting training camps in the Canary Islands as his sailing base.
4 nations (Switzerland, Greece, India, Spain) qualified to the Tokyo 2020 Olympic Games in Laser Radial class following Tamas's coaching program between 2016 and 2021.

References 

1976 births
Hungarian male sailors (sport)
Living people
Sailors at the 1996 Summer Olympics – Laser
Sailors at the 2000 Summer Olympics – Laser
Olympic sailors of Hungary
Sportspeople from Keszthely